O'Hara's Wife is a 1982 American comedy-drama film directed by William Bartman and starring Edward Asner, Mariette Hartley and Jodie Foster. It is Bartman's sole directorial effort.

Plot 
Bob O'Hara is a hard-working lawyer, who tends to focus on his career at the expense of his health and children, Barbara and Rob. After his wife Harry dies, she returns as a ghost, advising him to slow down and adjust his priorities.

Cast 

 Edward Asner as  Bob O'Hara
 Mariette Hartley as Harry O'Hara
 Jodie Foster as Barbara O'Hara
 Perry Lang as Rob O'Hara
 Tom Bosley as Fred O'Hara
 Ray Walston as Walter Tatum
  Allen Williams  as Billy Tatum
 Mary Jo Catlett as Gloria
  Nelson Welch  as Nelson Attleby
 Richard Schaal as Jerry Brad
 Nehemiah Persoff as Doctor Fischer
 Kelly Bishop as Beth Douglas
 Erik Kilpatrick as a police officer
 Frank Ronzio as Angelo 
 Juanita Moore as Ethel 
 Howard Mann as a moving man
  Tony Ballen  as an assistant moving man 
  Dean Santoro as an appraiser
 Barney Phillips as a small wino
  Fred Scheiwiller as a large wino

References

External links 

1982 films
1982 comedy-drama films
1982 directorial debut films
1980s English-language films
1980s fantasy comedy-drama films
American comedy-drama films
American fantasy comedy-drama films
American ghost films
1980s American films